Maine Road Football Club is a football club, based in Chorlton-cum-Hardy, Manchester, England.

History
The club was formed in 1955 by supporters of Manchester City under the name City Supporters Rusholme. They played friendly matches before joining the Rusholme Sunday League, remaining members until transferring to the Manchester Amateur Sunday League in 1966. The club also moved its headquarters to the Maine Road Social Club and were renamed Maine Road Football Club. After winning the Manchester County Sunday Cup and the league title in 1971–72, the club switched to Saturday football and joined Division Two of the Manchester League.

Maine Road won the Division Two title at the first attempt, earning promotion to Division One, as well as winning the Manchester County Amateur Cup. They went on to win Division One the following season and were promoted to the Premier Division. In 1975–76 the club won the Manchester Premier Cup, beating Abbey Hey WMC in the final; they retained the trophy the following season with a win over Little Lever. In 1982–83 the club were Premier Division champions. They retained the title for the next three seasons, before finishing as runners-up in 1986–87, after which the club moved up to Division Two of the North West Counties League.

Maine Road's first season in the North West Counties League saw them win the Manchester Premier Cup for a third time, beating Irlam Town 1–0 in the final. Despite finishing as Division Two runners-up in 1988–89, the club were not promoted after failing to meet ground grading regulations. However, the following season saw them win the Division Two title, earning promotion to Division One. They were Manchester Premier Cup finalists in 1998–99. Although the club were relegated at the end of the 2001–02 season, they were Division Two runners-up in 2003–04, and were promoted back to Division One, as well as reaching the final of the Manchester Premier Cup again. The club won the league's Challenge Cup in 2007–08, after which Division One was renamed the Premier Division. The club were Premier Division runners-up in 2013–14.

Ground

After playing at several different ground, Maine Road moved to Brantingham Road in 1980. After the ground was upgraded by the Manchester Football Association in the mid-1980s, it enabled the club to be promoted to the North West Counties League. The ground currently has a capacity of 2,000, of which 200 is seated and 700 covered.

The club's record home attendance of 3,181 was set on 4 November 2006 for a Division One match against FC United of Manchester (a team formed by supporters of Manchester City's arch rivals, Manchester United) although the game was played at Bower Fold in Stalybridge.

Honours
North West Counties League
Division Two champions 1989–90
Challenge Cup winners 2007–08
Manchester League
Premier Division champions 1982–83, 1983–84, 1984–85, 1985–86
League Cup winners 1982–83, 1983–84
Division One champions 1973–74
Division Two champions 1972–73
Manchester Amateur Sunday League
Champions 1971–72
Manchester Premier Cup
Winners 1975–76, 1976–77, 1987–88
Manchester Challenge Cup
Winners 1982–83, 1984–85, 1985–86, 1986–87, 2004–05, 2006–07
Manchester Amateur Cup Winners
Champions 1972–73, 1997–98, 2006–07
Manchester County Sunday Cup
Winners 1971–72

Records
Best FA Cup performance: Second qualifying round, 1989–90, 1990–91, 1992–93, 1994–95, 1997–98, 2001–02
Best FA Vase performance: Fourth round, 1994–95
Record attendance: 3,125 vs FC United of Manchester, North West Counties League Division One, 4 November 2006 (at Bower Fold)

See also
Maine Road F.C. players
Manchester City F.C.
Manchester City L.F.C.
Manchester City F.C. Reserves and Academy
Manchester City F.C. supporters
List of fan-owned sports teams

References

External links
Official website

Football clubs in England
Football clubs in Manchester
Association football clubs established in 1955
1955 establishments in England
Fan-owned football clubs in England
Manchester City F.C.
Manchester Football League
North West Counties Football League clubs